Claude Gauvard is a French historian and Middle Ages specialist. She has been the President of Société de l'histoire de France since 2009.

Life 
She was an assistant at the University of Rouen in 1969, then at the Sorbonne in 1971. She is a professor at the Pantheon - Sorbonne University.  In 1989, she defended her doctoral thesis, Crime, État et société en France à la fin du Moyen Âge (which received the Malesherbes Prize and the Gobert Award from the Académie des Inscriptions et Belles-Lettres).

In 1990, she became a professor of history of the Middle Ages at the University of Reims. She returned to the Panthéon-Sorbonne University in 1992, where she taught history of the Middle Ages until 2009.

Works 
 De grace especial. Crime, État et société en France à la fin du Moyen Âge, 2 vol., Paris, Publications de la Sorbonne, 1991 (Reprinted 2010),
 Dir., La renommée, n° de la revue Médiévales, 24 (1993).
 La France au Moyen Âge du XVX siècle, Paris, PUF, 1996, (Reprinted 2010).
 Françoise Autrand & Jean-Marie Moeglin (dir.), Saint-Denis et la royauté : études offertes à Bernard Guenée, Paris, Publications de la Sorbonne, 1999.
 Robert Jacob (dir.), Les rites de la justice au Moyen Âge, Paris, Le Léopard d'or, 2000.
 Alain de Libera & Michel Zink (dir.), Dictionnaire du Moyen Âge, Paris, PUF, 2002.
 Pierre Boglioni &Robert Delort (dir.), Le petit peuple dans l'Occident médiéval : terminologies, perceptions, réalités : actes du Congrès international tenu à l'Université de Montréal (18-23 October 1999), Paris, Publications de la Sorbonne, 2002.
 Jean-Louis Robert (dir.), Être parisien : actes du colloque organisé par l'École doctorale d'histoire de l'Université Paris 1 Panthéon-Sorbonne et la Fédération des Sociétés historiques et archéologiques de Paris-Île-de-France (26-28 septembre 2002), Paris, Publications de la Sorbonne, 2004.
 Claire Boudreau, Kouky Fianou & Michel Hébert (dir.), Information et société en Occident à la fin du Moyen Âge, Paris, Publications de la Sorbonne, 2004.
 Violence et ordre public au Moyen Âge, Paris, Picard, 2005.
 Jacques Chiffoleau & Andrea Zorzi (dir.), Pratiques sociales et politiques judiciaires dans les villes de l'Occident à la fin du Moyen Âge, Rome, École française de Rome, 2007.
 Dir., L'Enquête au Moyen Âge, Rome, École française de Rome, 2008.
 Le Moyen Âge, Paris, la Martinière, 2010
 Dir. Jean-François Sirinelli, Pascal Cauchy, Les historiens français à l'œuvre, 1995-2010, Paris, PUF, 2010
 Loïc Cadiet, Frédéric Chauvaud, Pauline Schmitt-Pantel & Myriam Tsikounas (dir.), Figures de femmes criminelles de l'Antiquité à nos jours, Paris, Publications de la Sorbonne, 2010.
 Le temps des Valois, Paris, PUF, coll. « Une histoire personnelle de », 2013
 Le temps des Capétiens, Paris, PUF, coll. « Une histoire personnelle de », 2013
 La France au Moyen Âge du  au  siècle, Paris, PUF, 2014
 Sous sa direction et celle de Jean-François Sirinelli, Dictionnaire de l'historien, PUF, 2015, 786 pages.
 Sous sa direction, Une histoire de France, Paris, PUF, 2017.
Condamner à mort au Moyen Age. Pratiques de la peine capitale en France XIIIe-XVe siècle, Paris, PUF, 2018.

References 

1942 births
20th-century French historians
21st-century French historians
Living people
French women historians
Writers from Paris
20th-century French women writers
21st-century French women writers
Recipients of the Ordre des Arts et des Lettres
Academic staff of the University of Rouen Normandy
Academic staff of the University of Paris
Academic staff of the University of Reims Champagne-Ardenne